Franz Joachim Beich (1666–1748) was a Bavarian painter.

Life 
Franz Joachim Beich was born at Ravensburg (in today's Baden-Württemberg), on October 15, 1666. He was the son of Daniel Beich, a painter of little celebrity, from whom he received his instruction in the art.

He excelled in painting landscapes and battles. His best works are in the palaces of the Elector of Bavaria, in whose employment he was for several years; among these are several large pictures of the battles fought in Hungary by the Elector
Maximilian Emmanuel.

With the permission of his patron, he visited Italy, and made many drawings from the beautiful views in that country. His landscapes exhibit very pleasing scenery, and he appears to have imitated, in the arrangement of his pictures, the tasteful style of Gaspar Poussin.

He died in Munich on October 16, 1748, aged 82.

Works 
The Vienna Gallery has two landscapes by him, and the Munich Gallery has four. The latter gallery also possesses his portrait by Des Marées — "painted in 1744, when he was 78 years old." As an engraver, he has contributed several charming etchings to the portfolios of collectors. We have by him four sets of landscapes, with figures and buildings (amounting together to twenty-six plates), etched with great spirit and facility.

References

Attribution:

External links

 

1666 births
1748 deaths
People from Ravensburg
17th-century German painters
German male painters
18th-century German painters
18th-century German male artists
German Baroque painters
German engravers